Otsuji (written: 尾辻) is a Japanese surname. Notable people with the surname include:

, Japanese politician
, Japanese politician and activist
, Japanese judoka
, Japanese engineer

Japanese-language surnames